Kakhk District is a district (bakhsh) in Gonabad County, Razavi Khorasan Province, Iran. At the 2006 census, its population was 11,814, in 4,091 families.  The district has one city: Kakhk.  The district has two rural districts (dehestan): Kakhk Rural District and Zibad Rural District.

References 

Districts of Razavi Khorasan Province
Gonabad County